Ruslan Khadzhismelovich Tsalikov is a Russian First Deputy Minister of Defence and Order of Honour recipient.

Biography
Tsalikov was born on July 31, 1956 in Ordzhonikidze (now Vladikavkaz), North Ossetian ASSR. He graduated from the North Ossetian State University which was named in honour of Kosta Khetagurov in 1978 and five years later got a degree from the Moscow Institute of National Economy. Between those years he was an intern researcher in the same place and from 1983 to 1987 was a lecturer on labour economics and the same year became a subdean of the Economics Faculty at the same university. From 1987 to 1989, he was Economic Affairs' General Director, and from 1989 to 1990, worked at Control-and-Auditing Directorate as the Chief Controller. Tsalikov worked as Minister of Finance of North Ossetia for four years starting from 1990 and from 1994 till 2000 was the Chief of the Main Financial and Economic Administration under Boris Yeltsin. From 2000 to 2005, he worked for Ministry of Emergency Situations. He was promoted to the State Secretary by Vladimir Putin, a position which he held from 2005 to 2007. In 2010, he became a head of Ministry of Emergency Situations and then was invited as a guest on Special Correspondent on Russia-1.

From May to November 2012, he was the Vice Governor of the Moscow Region and starting from that date on, under Presidential Decree, he was promoted to Deputy Minister of Defence of the Russian Federation. He was scheduled to become Acting Governor of Moscow Region. He was made Acting Governor of Moscow Region on 6 November 2012 and served until 8 November 2012, when he was replaced by current Governor Andrei Vorobyov.

References

1956 births
Living people
Generals of the army (Russia)
1st class Active State Councillors of the Russian Federation
Russian military personnel
Recipients of the Order of Honour (Russia)
People from Vladikavkaz
Soviet economists
20th-century Russian economists
21st-century Russian economists
Full Cavaliers of the Order "For Merit to the Fatherland"
Governors of Moscow Oblast
North Ossetian State University alumni
Deputy Defence Ministers of Russia